Hermann Wulf (25 July 1915 – 19 May 1990) was an officer in the Wehrmacht of Nazi Germany during World War II and a Brigadegeneral in the Bundeswehr.

Wulf was a recipient of the Knight's Cross of the Iron Cross with Oak Leaves.

Awards and decorations 
 Iron Cross (1939) 2nd Class (15 September 1939) & 1st Class (21 June 1940)
 Honour Roll Clasp of the Army (5 February 1945)
 Close Combat Clasp in Gold (18 May 1944)
 Knight's Cross of the Iron Cross with Oak Leaves
 Knight's Cross on 13 October 1941 as Oberleutnant and Chef 9./Infanterie-Regiment 76
 520th Oak Leaves on 3 July 1944 as Major and commander of the III./Grenadier-Regiment 76 (motorized)

References

Citations

Bibliography

 
 

1915 births
1990 deaths
German Army officers of World War II
Recipients of the Knight's Cross of the Iron Cross with Oak Leaves
German prisoners of war in World War II held by the Soviet Union
People from Stormarn (district)
People from the Province of Schleswig-Holstein
Brigadier generals of the German Army
Military personnel from Schleswig-Holstein